Wesley Kent Fuchs (born 1954) is an American university professor and academic administrator. He was the 12th president of the University of Florida in Gainesville, Florida, serving from 2015 to 2023.  He previously served as the provost of Cornell University from 2009 through 2014.

In January 2022, Fuchs announced his intention to step down as President so that he may remain at UF and return to faculty. He was succeeded by Ben Sasse, a former United States senator from Nebraska.

Education

Fuchs holds a B.S.E. from Duke University; a M.Div. from Trinity Evangelical Divinity School; and a M.S. and Ph.D. in electrical engineering from the University of Illinois.

Career

Fuchs was a professor in the electrical and computer engineering department and the coordinated science laboratory at the University of Illinois, from 1985 to 1996. He was head of the school of electrical and computer engineering at Purdue University from 1996 to 2002. While at Purdue he was appointed to the Michael J. and Katherine R. Birck distinguished professorship. He was the Joseph Silbert dean of the Cornell University College of Engineering, from 2002 to 2008.

He was the fifteenth provost of Cornell University in October 2008. In 2011, he led in the team and strategy that resulted in the winning proposal, in partnership with the Technion and New York City, to create a new graduate applied sciences campus on Roosevelt Island in New York City. The Cornell Tech campus reported to him as provost. In 2009 Fuchs launched Cornell's re-imagining initiative that resulted in enhanced efficiency in administrative services. As provost, Fuchs was also responsible for transforming Cornell's budget model. In 2010 he led the development of Cornell's Strategic Plan and the establishment of metrics for assessing Cornell's academic stature.

National Science Board 
On September 16, 2016 President Barack Obama announced his intent to nominate Fuchs as a member of the National Science Board and National Science Foundation. He is a member of the board’s class of 2016 – 2022.

University of Florida 
As President of the University of Florida, Fuchs barred three professors from testifying in a voting rights lawsuit against Florida governor Ron DeSantis over Senate Bill 90. After the university blocked its professors from providing testimony in court, the University of Florida's accreditor started an investigation into the university.

Personal

Fuchs is married to Linda Moskeland Fuchs, who previously taught at The King's Academy in West Palm Beach, Florida. They have four children, two daughters-in-law, a son-in-law and three grandchildren.

See also
 List of Duke University people
 List of University of Florida presidents
 List of University of Illinois at Urbana–Champaign people

References

External links
Faculty web site
W. Kent Fuchs named CU's 15th provost
Provost Kent Fuchs reflects on Cornell's future and his own

1954 births
Living people
Cornell University faculty
Duke University Pratt School of Engineering alumni
Fellows of the Association for Computing Machinery
Fellow Members of the IEEE
Presidents of the University of Florida
University of Illinois alumni